Edmund Anthony Rodden (March 22, 1901 in Mattawa, Ontario — October 9, 1986) was a Canadian professional ice hockey player who played 97 games in the National Hockey League with the Chicago Black Hawks, Toronto Maple Leafs, Boston Bruins, and New York Rangers between 1926 and 1931. He won the Stanley Cup in 1929 with the Bruins.

He was a younger brother of National Hockey League referee and Canadian football coach Mike Rodden.

Career statistics

Regular season and playoffs

External links 
 

1901 births
1986 deaths
Boston Bruins players
Canadian ice hockey centres
Chicago Blackhawks players
Eveleth Rangers players
Ice hockey people from Ontario
London Panthers players
Minneapolis Millers (AHA) players
New York Rangers players
Ontario Hockey Association Senior A League (1890–1979) players
People from Mattawa, Ontario
Pittsburgh Yellow Jackets (IHL) players
Quebec Castors players
Stanley Cup champions
Toronto Maple Leafs players
Tulsa Oilers (AHA) players
Windsor Bulldogs (1929–1936) players